The 2007 Canoe Sprint European Championships were held in Pontevedra, Spain.

Medal overview

Men

Women

Medal table

References

External links
 European Canoe Association

Canoe Sprint European Championships
Can
2007 in canoeing
Canoeing and kayaking competitions in Spain